The native states of India, also known as feudatory or princely states, were typically vassals under a local or regional ruler who owed allegiance to the British Raj. There were about 675 native states in all but many were not parts of British India proper because they never become possessions of the British Crown; rather, they were tied to it in a system of subsidiary alliances. Following the Partition of India in 1947, the suzerainty of the Raj was terminated and native states had to choose between independence or formal accession by either India or Pakistan. In practice, all of the native states had acceded or been annexed by the end of 1949.

For postal purposes, many native states ran their own services and their stamp issues have been termed feudatory by the main catalogues such as Stanley Gibbons Ltd. There were exceptions in the form of six convention states who made separate postal arrangements with the Raj and used British India stamps that were overprinted with the state's name.

Stamp-issuing native states

The native states which issued postage stamps have been categorised as either convention states or feudatory states. The words 'convention' and 'feudatory' in this sense referred solely to postal arrangements with or in relation to British India.

In all, there were some 675 feudatory states at various times, but not all issued postal stamps and/or stationery. Many of the first issues were printed locally, using primitive methods such as typography and so they can be very rare. There was low quality of printing and design in many cases and collectors sometimes informally refer to them as "Uglies". All remaining feudatory issues were replaced by stamps of the Republic of India on 1 April 1950 and most were declared obsolete from 1 May 1950 – there was one exception in the Anchal stamps of Travancore-Cochin which remained current until 1 July 1951.

There were six convention states: Chamba, Faridkot, Gwalior, Jind, Nabha and Patiala. They all used stamps of British India which were overprinted with the name of the state in Latin or Hindi/Urdu letters, or both. The Gibbons catalogue omits minor varieties of these stamps which had printing errors such as smaller letters, broken letters, unequal inking and unequal spacing. The convention issues were replaced by those of the Republic of India on 1 April 1950 but remained current until 31 December of that year, becoming obsolete from 1 January 1951.

The native states which issued stamps were as follows. Unless otherwise stated, the currency in use was 12 pies = 1 anna; 16 annas = 1 rupee. The dates are the starting and ending dates of stamp issue validity:

See also
 Postage stamps and postal history of Bahawalpur (1945–1949)
 Postage stamps and postal history of Las Bela (1897–1907)

References

Notes

Citations

Sources

Further reading
 
 
 

Economic history of India
Philately of India
States, Indian